"Classical music" and "art music" are terms that have been used to refer to music of different cultural origins and traditions. Such traditions often date to a period regarded as the "golden age" of music for a particular culture.

The following tables list music styles from throughout the world and the period in history when that tradition was developed:

Southeast Asian

Indic

East Asian

European

Middle Eastern

Sub-Saharan African

Syncretic

References

Further reading
 
 

Lists of music genres